The Welsh Football League Challenge Cup (known for a time as the Nathaniel Car Sales League Cup for sponsorship reasons, and not to be confused with the national Welsh League Cup) was a knock-out competition for all members of the divisions that make up the Welsh Football League in south Wales.

Winners

Titles per club

References

See also
Football in Wales
Welsh football league system
Welsh Cup
Welsh League Cup
FAW Premier Cup
List of football clubs in Wales
List of stadiums in Wales by capacity

1926 establishments in Wales
Welsh League Cup
Recurring sporting events established in 1926
Cup
Defunct football competitions in Wales